Demos and Live Cuts Vol. I is the first compilation album by Michale Graves. The album includes a collection of demos, pre-production drafts, and live outtakes from a 2006 performance at CBGB’s in New York City.

Track listing

References
Demos and Live Cuts Vol. I

Michale Graves albums
Demo albums
2007 compilation albums
Horror punk compilation albums